Aquarius Films is an independent Australian film and TV production company based in Sydney, founded in 2008 by producers Angie Fielder and Polly Staniford.  
TV credits include Love Me,  The Unusual Suspects, The Other Guy and Savage River Film credits include Academy Award and Golden Globe nominated Lion starring Dev Patel and Nicole Kidman, produced by Aquarius in association with See-Saw Films and the psychological thriller Berlin Syndrome starring Teresa Palmer and Directed by Cate Shortland which premiered at Sundance Film Festival, Dirt Music, directed by Gregor Jordan and starring Garrett Hedlund, Kelly Macdonald and David Wenham and Wish You Were Here, starring Joel Edgerton and Teresa Palmer, which premiered at Sundance Film Festival and won two Australian Academy of Cinema and Television Arts (AACTA) Awards, including Best Screenplay, and five Film Critics Circle Awards, including Best Film. 

Romantic drama series Love Me starring Hugo Weaving, by Aquarius for Warner Bros. Australia and Foxtel’s BINGE, premiered in the USA on Hulu in April 2021, and premiered on BINGE in December 2021. Mini-series The Unusual Suspects starring Miranda Otto and Aina Dumlao is streaming on Hulu and premiered on SBS in June 2021 and their 10 x 30’ YA series for the Australian Broadcasting Corporation, Born To Spy, premiered in December 2021. 
Additional television credits include The Other Guy Seasons 1 & 2, a 6 x 30’ comedy-drama, for Stan and Hulu starring Matt Okine, Valene Kane and Harriet Dyer and The Unlisted, a 15 x 30’ YA sci-fi thriller for Netflix and the Australian Broadcasting Corporation. Aquarius Film's most recent production Savage River, a 6 x 1’ crime drama series directed by Jocelyn Moorhouse and starring Katherine Langford premiered on 4 September 2022 for the Australian Broadcasting Corporation. 

Aquarius Films received the 2018 NSW Creative Laureate and the 2018 SPA Screen Business Export of the Year Award. In 2022 Aquarius was nominated for two SPA awards; Screen Business Export of the Year and Telemovie or Mini-series Production of the Year for their production The Unusual Suspects.

Productions

Film

Television

References

External links
 

Film production companies of Australia
Entertainment companies established in 2008
Australian companies established in 2008
Companies based in Sydney